Lestari is an Indonesian surname. Notable people with the surname include:
 Bunga Citra Lestari (born 1983), Indonesian singer, actress, talent show judge, and television personality
 Dewi Lestari (born 1976), Indonesian writer, singer, and songwriter
 Mardi Lestari (born 1968), retired Indonesian athlete
 Nisak Puji Lestari (born 1997), Indonesian badminton player
 Paramytha Lestari Mulyarto (born 1991), Indonesian pop singer 
 Swietenia Puspa Lestari (born 1994), Indonesian underwater diver, environmental engineer and environmental activist 

Indonesian-language surnames
Surnames of Indonesian origin